MDM may refer to:

Computers and data
 Master data management, the organization and control of reference or master data shared by disparate IT systems and groups
 Metadata management, storing and organizing information about other information
 Mobile device management, software for the administration of smartphones and other mobile devices
 Multiplexer-demultiplexer
 Meter data management, data storage and management software

Entertainment 
 Melodic death metal, a music genre
 M-D-Emm, a British electronic music group
 Mere Dead Men, a British punk band
 Modern Drunkard, a magazine
 Moi dix Mois, a Japanese metal band
My Dear Melancholy, an album by The Weeknd

Science and medicine 
 Mdm2 protein, encoded by the MDM2 gene in humans
 Medical decision-making, part of differential diagnosis in clinical medicine
 Multiple drafts model, a theory of consciousness
 Portal of Medical Data Models, medical research infrastructure

Organizations and businesses 
 Democratic Movement of Mozambique (Movimento Democrático de Moçambique), a political party
 Mass Democratic Movement, part of the United Democratic Front in South Africa
 Médecins du Monde (MdM), a medical humanitarian organisation
 Movement for a Democratic Military, a GI antiwar and resistance organization during the Vietnam War
 MDM Bank in Russia

Other uses 
 Mayogo language (ISO 639-3:mdm), spoken in the DR Congo
 MDM Observatory, in Arizona
 MDM-1 Fox, a glider aircraft
 MDM Motorsports, an American professional stock car racing team
 Mechanically deboned meat, a meat-handling process